Hu-Du-Men (also Tiger Pass Gate) is a 1996 Hong Kong comedy film directed by Shu Kei. The film was selected as the Hong Kong entry for the Best Foreign Language Film at the 69th Academy Awards, but was not accepted as a nominee.

Cast
 Josephine Siao as Lang Kim-Sum
 Anita Yuen as Yip Yuk-Sum
 Daniel Chan as Wong Man-Chun
 Waise Lee as Lung
 King-fai Chung as Chan Yiu-Cho

See also
 List of submissions to the 69th Academy Awards for Best Foreign Language Film
 List of Hong Kong submissions for the Academy Award for Best Foreign Language Film

References

External links
 

1996 films
1996 comedy films
1990s Cantonese-language films
Hong Kong comedy films
Films about Cantonese opera
1990s Hong Kong films